Pierre Eugene du Simitiere (born Pierre-Eugène Ducimetière, ; 18 September 1737, Geneva – October 1784, Philadelphia, Pennsylvania) was a Genevan American member of the American Philosophical Society, naturalist, American patriot, and portrait painter.

Du Simitiere served as the artistic consultant for the committees that designed the Great Seal of the United States, and submitted the first proposed design to include the Eye of Providence and suggested the adoption of the U.S. motto E pluribus unum ("Out of Many, One").

Biography
Born in Geneva, du Simitiere's original name was Pierre-Eugène Ducimetière or Pierre-Eugène du Cimetière. After leaving the Republic of Geneva, he spent more than a decade in the West Indies before moving to New York and then Philadelphia. He spelled his name Pierre-Eugène du Simitière, Pierre Eugene du Simitiere  or du Symitiere after settling in Philadelphia. Elected to the American Philosophical Society in 1768, he further became one of its curators (1777–1781).

Du Simitiere served as the artistic consultant for the committees that designed the Great Seal of the United States, and in 1776 he submitted the first proposed design to include the Eye of Providence, which element was eventually adopted. Moreover, he suggested the adoption of the U.S. motto E pluribus unum ("Out of Many, One"). He also designed the Seal of New Jersey, of Delaware, and of Georgia. In 1779, du Simitiere painted the first known portrait of George Washington, later used for the 1791 one-cent coin. In 1781, he was conferred an honorary degree from Princeton University (which was still called College of New Jersey until 1896). Thomas Jefferson's daughter Martha took drawing lessons with du Simitiere.

Du Simitiere was the translator into French for the Letters to the inhabitants of Canada from the Continental Congress designed to draw the new British subjects of Quebec into the American Revolutionary War.

"His early interest in natural history had expanded to embrace geography, geology, mineralogy, archeology, numismatics, and every aspect of American history, including aboriginal, general, local, political, social, and cultural history. He collected books in English and other languages and was a bibliographer of skill and breadth. He accumulated pamphlets, newspapers, handbills, and every other kind of political publication. He strove to record the history of the Colonies, including their differences with England and their eventual struggle for independence. Perhaps oddly for a collector, he was generous in lending books and other materials from his collections. In 1781 the College of New Jersey (now Princeton) granted him an honorary degree of Master of Arts.

"All the while he continued to practice his profession of artist and painter, from which he earned a precarious living. He drew designs for a variety of state, local, and institutional seals. He drew maps, frontispieces, and technical illustrations for publications. He did pencil, chalk, and water-color portraits for a fee — though he seems not to have worked in oil. He seized every opportunity to sketch from life the notables, both American and British, who came to Philadelphia; and more often than not his sketches went into his own collection.

"His great personal vision embraced the founding of an American museum and the compiling of a history of the Colonies. In his efforts to achieve his objectives, he fought a constant battle with poverty and with the lack of interest of persons who might have helped him gather materials. In a measure he realized his vision briefly in his 'American Museum,' located in a house in Arch Street above 4th, which he advertised as early as September 1782. But the history was never written; he died destitute, and his collections were sold to pay his debts. He is now regarded as the founder of the first history museum in the United States."

Other events

First American museum of natural history
He created the first American museum of natural history from his personal collections constituted during his travels and through his purchases. He opened it to the public in 1782, over forty years before the Charleston Museum, which is generally considered the first American museum.

First coin auction sale in America
His coin collection was the first record in Early American history to serve as collateral on a loan granted to him by William Dilwyn. This collection later on was sold at public auction by Matthew Clarkson and Ebenezer Hazard, on March 19, 1785 at Philadelphia. Included in the sale as Lot #19 was "A Mahogany cabinet containing ancient and modern Gold, Silver, and Copper Coins and Medals." This sale precedes all sales in Atinelli's Numisgraphics  by 43 years and is considered to be the first known coin auction sale in America. An advertisement for this sale reposes in the Archives of the Library Company of Philadelphia.

Du Simitiere has living descendants throughout Switzerland, France, and the US.

In a letter to his wife on August 14, 1776, John Adams wrote 
"This Mr. du Simitière is a very curious Man. He has begun a Collection of Materials for an History of this Revolution. He begins with the first Advices of the Tea Ships. He cuts out of the Newspapers, every Scrap of Intelligence, and every Piece of Speculation, and pastes it upon clean Paper, arranging them under the Head of the State to which they belong and intends to bind them up in Volumes. He has a List of every Speculation and Pamphlet concerning Independence, and another of those concerning Forms of Government."

Notes

References
 Orosz, Joel J., The Eagle That is Forgotten (Wolfenboro, 1988)
 Van Horne, John C., Pierre Eugene DuSimitiere: His American Museum 200 Years after (Philadelphia, 1985)
 

1736 births
1784 deaths
18th-century artists from the Republic of Geneva
18th-century scientists from the Republic of Geneva
American philosophers
Members of the American Philosophical Society
Natural history collectors
Museum founders
18th-century philanthropists